Sítio do Picapau Amarelo was a Brazilian comic book series based on the eponymous novel series Sítio do Picapau Amarelo by Monteiro Lobato. It was originally released in 1977 on the success of the TV series produced by Rede Globo, comic books were published by the publisher RGE who would later become Editora Globo. It continued to be sold until 1979 when the characters Emília, Pedrinho and Visconde now has his own comics replacing the Sítio do Picapau Amarelo, but the comics only lasted two years being sold, and in 1981 the Sítio do Picapau Amarelo returned to be published. The comics being published remained until 1984, two years before the TV series is no longer in production.

Only in 2006 they returned the comic books to be published, this time with the seal of Editora Globo spent besides being based so far by recent TV series produced in 2001 also by Rede Globo. The main reason for his return was due to exit of Monica's Gang to publisher Panini Comics, making them would cover space with other comics like O Menino Maluquinho and Cocoricó. It is derived from other comics as the comics of villain Cuca, the return of the comics Emilia, among others. However, since when the TV series was canceled in 2007 as none of them gave good yields all ended up being canceled in early 2008 not going to have any more comic in publisher.

Titles 
Editora RGE
Sítio do Picapau Amarelo (1977–1979; 1981–1984) - 28 issues (first series), 36 issues (second series)
Almanaque do Sítio do Picapau Amarelo (1977–1980; 1983) - 8 issues (first series), 2 issues (second series)
Sítio do Picapau Amarelo Especial (1978–1979) - 3 issues
Emília (1979–1980) - 6 issues (first series)
Pedrinho (1979–1980) - 3 issues
Visconde (1979–1980) - 3 issues

Editora Globo
Sítio do Picapau Amarelo (2006–2008) - 18 issues (third series)
Cuca (2006–2008) - 15 issues
Você Sabia? Sítio do Picapau Amarelo (2006–2008) - 15 issues
Emília (2007–2008) - 12 issues (second series)

References

Brazilian comics titles
Comics based on fiction
Fantasy comics
1977 comics debuts
2006 comics debuts
Sítio do Picapau Amarelo